The Ray Bradbury Theater is an anthology series that ran for three seasons on First Choice Superchannel in Canada and HBO in the United States from 1985 to 1986, and then on USA Network, running for four additional seasons from 1988 to 1992; episodes aired on the Global Television Network in Canada from 1991 to 1994. It was shown in reruns on the Sci Fi Channel and later on the Retro Television Network. It currently airs on Comet and can be streamed on IMDb TV, Peacock, Pluto TV and The Roku Channel.

All 65 episodes were written by Ray Bradbury, based on short stories or novels he wrote, including "A Sound of Thunder", "Marionettes, Inc.", "Banshee", "The Playground", "Mars is Heaven", "Usher II", "The Jar", "The Long Rain", "The Veldt", "The Small Assassin", "The Pedestrian", "The Fruit at the Bottom of the Bowl", "Here There Be Tygers", "The Toynbee Convector", and "Sun and Shadow".

Many of the episodes focused on only one of Bradbury's original works. However, Bradbury occasionally included elements from his other works. "Marionettes, Inc." featured Fantoccini, a character from "I Sing the Body Electric!". "Gotcha!" included an opening sequence taken from "The Laurel and Hardy Love Affair". Characters were renamed, and elements added to the original works to expand the story to 23–28 minutes or to better suit the television medium.

Each episode would begin with a shot of Bradbury in his office, gazing over mementos of his life, which he states (in narrative) are used to spark ideas for stories. During the first season, Bradbury sometimes appeared on-screen in brief vignettes introducing the story. During the second season, Bradbury provided the opening narration with no specific embellishment concerning the episode. During the third season, a foreshortened version of the narration was used and Bradbury would add specific comments relevant to the episode presented. During the fourth and later seasons, a slightly shorter generic narration was used with no additional comments.

Famous actors appearing in the series included Richard Kiley, Paul Le Mat, Eileen Brennan, James Coco, William Shatner, Peter O'Toole, Patrick Macnee, Jeff Goldblum, Drew Barrymore, Hal Linden, Michael Ironside, Robert Vaughn, Eugene Levy, Saul Rubinek, Paul Gross, Donald Pleasence, Denholm Elliott, David Ogden Stiers, John Saxon, Harold Gould, Bruce Weitz, Barry Morse, Eddie Albert, David Carradine, Sally Kellerman, Vincent Gardenia, Robert Culp, Shawn Ashmore, Richard Benjamin, John Vernon, Elliott Gould, Tyne Daly, Lucy Lawless, Jean Stapleton, Marc Singer, Michael Hurst, Louise Fletcher, Magali Noël, John Glover, Howard Hesseman, Leslie Nielsen, Megan Follows, Shelley Duvall, and James Whitmore.

External links

Ray Bradbury Theater at bradburymedia.co.uk
"The Playground" episode synopsis by Phil Nichols

HBO original programming
USA Network original programming
1980s American science fiction television series
1990s American science fiction television series
1980s Canadian science fiction television series
1990s Canadian science fiction television series
1985 American television series debuts
1992 American television series endings
1985 Canadian television series debuts
1992 Canadian television series endings
1980s American anthology television series
English-language television shows
Adaptations of works by Ray Bradbury
Science fiction anthology television series
Television series by Alliance Atlantis
Television shows based on short fiction
Television series by South Pacific Pictures